The Serra da Galga Formation is a geological formation in Minas Gerais state of southeastern Brazil. Its strata date back to the Maastrichtian, and are part of the Bauru Group.It was originally considered a member of the Marília Formation.

Dinosaur remains are among the fossils that have been recovered from the formation.

Fossil content

Crurotarsans

Ornithodirans 
Three distinct titanosaurids denoted as forms A, B, and C have been found in Area 4. Titanosaurine remains are known from Areas 1 and 2. Indeterminate theropod remains known from Area 1.  Indeterminate maniraptor remains known from Area 1. Indeterminate abelisaurid remains are known from Areas 1 and 2. Indeterminate Carcharodontosaurid remains are known from Area 1.

See also 
 List of dinosaur-bearing rock formations

References

Bibliography 
 
 
 
 

Geologic formations of Brazil
Cretaceous Brazil
Sandstone formations
Mudstone formations
Siltstone formations
Limestone formations
Fluvial deposits
Lacustrine deposits
Cretaceous paleontological sites of South America
Paleontology in Brazil
Landforms of Minas Gerais